Alexander Reford  is an historian by training, with master's degrees in history from the University of Toronto and Oxford University. Born in Ottawa, Ontario, in 1962, he was raised and educated in the Outaouais region of Québec. He held the position of Dean of College at St. Michael's College at the University of Toronto from 1987 to 1995. He left to assume the directorship of Les Jardins de Métis (Reford Gardens), a cultural destination and tourist attraction located on the banks of the St. Lawrence in Grand-Métis, Quebec. The great-grandson of Elsie Reford, creator of the Gardens, he was instrumental in creating the not for profit organization that purchased them from the Quebec government in 1995. Under his stewardship, a complete restoration of the gardens and the historic buildings on the property has been undertaken.

Professional associations

He is the co-founder and director of the International Garden Festival, an annual event held since 2000 that has been acclaimed by critics and garden writers as one of the premier garden design events in the world. The Gardens have also become a leader in nature conservation, undertaking the preservation of tracts of land along the St. Lawrence River and creating an ecological park on the banks of the Metis River that opened in the summer of 2002.

Alexander Reford is a member of the board of directors of the Canadian Tourism Commission where he serves as the representative of the small and medium-sized enterprises from Quebec. He is also president of the Association touristique régionale de la Gaspésie. He is involved in various organizations involved in gardens, tourism, historic preservation and culture and is an active volunteer in Quebec's Lower St. Lawrence/Gaspésie region where he lives.

Publications

He has written numerous books and articles. He is a frequent contributor to the Dictionary of Canadian Biography and is the author of the biographies of Lord Mount Stephen and Lord Strathcona and his great great grandfathers, Robert Meighen and Robert Reford.

His first book, Des jardins oubliés 1860-1960, an album of photographs of Quebec's historic gardens, was published in 1999. He wrote a guidebook to the Reford Gardens in 2001. Au rythme du train 1859-1970, an album of photographs illustrating the history of trains in Quebec, was published in 2002. He has two other books on the history of the gardens, notably Elsie's Paradise – Reford Gardens and its sequel on the garden's plant collections, Treasures of Reford Gardens - Elsie Reford's Floral Legacy. He wrote The Metis Lighthouse with Paul Gendron and is leading efforts to preserve this local landmark. He is writing a book on the gardens of Québec and a history of tourism in the province.

Awards

He was one of the "Top Forty Under Forty" in 2000. He has also been given various honours for his contribution to landscape architecture and gardens. He was made an honorary member of the Canadian Society of Landscape Architects. In 2009, he was awarded the Frederick-Todd Prize by the Association des Architectes Paysagistes du Québec. In the same year, the Montréal Botanical Garden bestowed the Henry-Teuscher Prize on Alexander Reford and Elsie Reford (posthumous) for their contribution to horticulture in Québec.  In 2021 he was appointed to the Order of Canada.

References

https://web.archive.org/web/20100211061353/http://mocoloco.com/archives/001453.php

Sources
http://www.refordgardens.com
http://www.editions-homme.com/ficheAuteur.aspx?codeaut=REFO1000
https://web.archive.org/web/20100302034412/http://www.top40award-canada.org/award/old/2000.shtml
https://web.archive.org/web/20100105063440/http://www.aapq.org/16.html
http://www2.ville.montreal.qc.ca/jardin/candidature_henry_teuscher.pdf

Living people
1962 births
Writers from Ottawa
Canadian horticulturists
Canadian garden writers
Members of the Order of Canada
People from Bas-Saint-Laurent